New Jersey Meadowlands, also known as the Hackensack Meadowlands after the primary river flowing through it, is a general name for the large ecosystem of wetlands in northeastern New Jersey in the United States, a few miles to the west of New York City. In the 20th century, much of the Meadowlands area was urbanized, and it became known for being the site of large landfills and decades of environmental abuse. A variety of projects are underway to restore and conserve the remaining ecological resources in the Meadowlands.

Geography
The Meadowlands stretch mainly along the terminus of the Hackensack and Passaic Rivers as they flow into Newark Bay; tributaries of the Hackensack include Mill Creek, Berrys Creek, and Overpeck Creek. The Meadowlands consist of roughly 8,400 acres (34 km2) of open, undeveloped space in addition to developed areas that had been part of the natural wetlands which were heavily developed by H. Bert Mack and M. Bolero in the 1960s. The area includes portions of Kearny, Jersey City, North Arlington, Secaucus, Lyndhurst, Rutherford, East Rutherford, Carlstadt, North Bergen, Moonachie, Ridgefield, South Hackensack, Teaneck, and Little Ferry.

History
The area was forested with Atlantic white cedar before the early Dutch settlers cleared the cedar forests and used dikes to drain the land. The Dutch farmers used the drained tidal lands to create "meadows" of salt hay; hence, the area was referred to by locals as the Meadows. In more recent times, the Meadowlands became known for being the site of large landfills and decades of environmental abuse.

Human impact 
Before European settlement, the area consisted of several diverse ecosystems based on freshwater, brackish water, and saltwater environments. Large areas were covered by forests. Considered by residents of the area through the centuries as wastelands, the Meadowlands were systematically subject to various kinds of human intervention. The four major categories are:
 Extraction of natural resources (including fish and game, as well as cedar logs). Farmers also harvested salt hay for feed. Over time, the forest resources were totally depleted, dike systems broke down, farming ceased, and contamination by pollution increased.
 Alteration of water flow. Drainage canals and especially the deepening of the Hackensack River for navigation have allowed salt water to enter the original fresh water and brackish water areas, altering the ecology and destroying the estuarine environment.
 Reclamation, land making, and development. In addition to landfill from garbage, landmass generated from dredging was also used to create new land. Some material came from building the World Trade Center in nearby New York City, in the late 1960s.
 Pollution by sewage, refuse, and hazardous waste. Various types of waste have been dumped legally and illegally in the Meadowlands. During World War II, military refuse was dumped in the Meadowlands, including rubble from London created by the Blitz and used as ballast in returning ships. After the war, the Meadowlands continued to be used for civilian waste disposal, as the marshes were seen simply as wastelands that were not good for anything else. Berrys Creek was extensively polluted with mercury, PCBs and other chemical wastes, and three adjacent industrial properties have been designated as Superfund sites. The opening of the New Jersey Turnpike in January 1952 only amplified the continuing environmental decline of the Meadowlands, as both spurs of the Turnpike travel through the region from the Passaic River to just past North Bergen.

The Meadowlands Sports Complex, the site of multiple stadia and a racetrack, was built in the Meadowlands beginning in the 1960s. The race track was the first venue in the complex to open, on September 1, 1976.

New Jersey Meadowlands Commission

The location of the New Jersey Meadowlands near the center of the New York metropolitan area and its outgrowth into New Jersey makes conservation of the vast wetland a difficult proposition. In spite of this, the New Jersey Legislature, led by Richard W. DeKorte, created the Hackensack Meadowlands Development Commission (since renamed New Jersey Meadowlands Commission and now known as the New Jersey Sports & Exposition Authority after being merged with that agency) in 1969 to attempt to address both economic and environmental issues concerning the wetland region. The commission was authorized to review and approve land development projects, manage landfill operations, and oversee environmental restoration and preservation projects.

The commission merged with the New Jersey Sports and Exposition Authority in 2015.

Conservation efforts
Even under grave environmental circumstances, the Meadowlands contain many species of fish, crustaceans, and mollusks and are considered to be an important bird habitat. Congress has provided funds through the U.S. Environmental Protection Agency to protect and preserve the Meadowlands and establish organizations to research the unique animals and their interaction with the ecosystem. The ecosystem is a fragile environment that waterfowl and other species of animals need. Richard W. DeKorte Park in the Meadowlands is known for bird watching, particularly for migratory waterfowl.  However, since the 1990s commercial development, installation of NJ Transit's new Kearny Station, which was completed June 2019, and the multitude of residential development, this ecologically vibrant area is being removed all with NJDEP approvals.

See also
Marine life of New York-New Jersey Harbor Estuary
Meadowlands Museum

References

External links
Meadowlands Museum
Hackensack Riverkeeper
New Jersey Meadowlands Commission Master Plan
Meadowlands Regional Chamber of Commerce
Meadowlands Liberty Convention & Visitors Bureau
Meadowlands Environment Center
New Jersey Sports and Exposition Authority website
Wild New Jersey - "The Fishes Swim Through it? Once Again"
New Jersey Meadowlands at National Geographic
Photos of Mill Creek Marsh, Meadowlands Preserve
Photo Gallery
I Sing the Meadowlands
Beyond Passaic: Contamination, security threats, hobo encampments. A Meadowlands photo essay

Regions of New Jersey
Meadowlands
Meadowlands
Wetlands of New Jersey
Estuaries of New Jersey
New Jersey Meadowlands District
Hackensack River
Passaic River

fi:The Meadowlands